Carol Ruckdeschel is a biologist, naturalist, environmental activist and author. As a Cumberland Island resident, she was involved in the creation and preservation of Cumberland Island National Seashore. She is the subject of the book Untamed: The Wildest Woman in America and the Fight for Cumberland Island by Will Harlan.

She has researched sea turtles and endangered and extinct species around the Georgia coast.

Her residence on the north part of Cumberland Island is currently owned by The National Park Service, on the condition of her remaining there until her death.

Books

Journal articles 

 Robert Shoop, C., and Carol Ruckdeschel. "Increasing turtle strandings in the southeast United States: a complicating factor." Biological Conservation 23.3 (1982): 213–215.
 Frazier, J. G., Judith E. Winston, and Carol A. Ruckdeschel. "Epizoan communities on marine turtles. III. Bryozoa." Bulletin of marine science 51.1 (1992): 1–8.

References

External links 
 http://wildcumberland.org/ (Website about Cumberland Island preservation and conservation issues)

1941 births
Scientists from Rochester, New York
People from Cumberland Island
Living people
American conservationists
Wildlife biologists
American women biologists
Activists from Rochester, New York
21st-century American women